Peter Aloysius Müller (born 25 September 1955 in Illingen, Saar Protectorate) is a German politician belonging to the Christian Democratic Union (CDU). From 1999 to 2011, he has held the position of  Premier (Ministerpräsident) of the state of Saarland, serving as President of the Bundesrat in 2008/09. In December 2011, Müller was elected as judge of German Bundesverfassungsgericht.

Education and early career
After sitting the Abitur (German final exams) in 1974 at the Realgymnasium in Lebach, Müller studied jurisprudence and politics in the Bonn and Saarbrücken. He sat for the two required State Examinations in Law, the first in 1983, and the second in 1986.  From then until 1994, he served as a judge at the district court of Saarbrücken, as well as a research fellow for Saarland University.

Political career
Müller is a member of the CDU. In 1995, he was elected chairman of the CDU in Saarland. He was also part of the CDU's informal internal grouping, the "Jungen Wilden" (Young Turks), as well as of the "Andenpakt" (Andes Pact).

Saarland Legislative Assembly, 1990–2011
From 1990, Müller was a Member of the Landtag of the Saarland. From 1994 through 1999, he was the chairman of the CDU parliamentary group in the assembly, making him the leader of the opposition against the governments of Ministers-President Oskar Lafontaine (1990-1998) and Reinhard Klimmt (1998-1999). In this capacity, he publicly spoke out against Angela Merkel and instead endorsed Edmund Stoiber as the party's candidate to challenge incumbent Chancellor Gerhard Schröder in the 2002 federal elections.

On 17 August 2005 the then Chancellor-candidate Angela Merkel chose Müller to be a member of her shadow cabinet as a prospective minister of economics and trade. In the federal election of 2005, he obtained a federal party ticket in Saarland. He was part of the CDU/CSU team in the negotiations with the SPD on a coalition agreement, which paved the way to the formation of Chancellor Angela Merkel’s first government. However, on 26 November 2005 he decided not to take up his post as a Member of Parliament (Bundestag). He was succeeded by Hermann Scharf.

Minister-President of Saarland, 1998–2011
After the CDU received 45.5% of the votes, a narrow majority government, he became Minister-President of Saarland. On 3 September 2004 the CDU was able to expand upon its advantage in the parliament elections. In 2009, he formed a so-called Jamaica coalition with the liberal FDP and the Greens before leaving office in 2011 to accept an appointment to the Federal Constitutional Court.

Between 2003 and 2007, Müller also served as Commissioner of the Federal Republic of Germany for Cultural Affairs under the Treaty on Franco-German Cooperation. During his time in office, the first joint French-German history textbook, by French and German authors, was unveiled in May 2006.

Judge of the Federal Constitutional Court, 2011–present
Ahead of the 2014 European elections, Müller issued a dissenting opinion on the Second Senate's judgement that a three-percent electoral threshold in the law governing European elections is unconstitutional. He argued that “the impairment of the European Parliament's ability to function is sufficiently important to justify an interference with the principles of electoral equality and equal opportunities of political parties.“

In 2018, the Second Senate of the Federal Constitutional Court decided that it must render its decision on a constitutional complaint directed against the prohibition of assisted suicide services (§ 217 StGB) without participation of Müller on the grounds of possible bias. During his time as Minister-President, his government (unsuccessfully) submitted a draft law prohibiting assisted suicide services in 2006.

Other activities
 European Foundation for the Speyer Cathedral, Member of the Board of Trustees
 donum vitae, Member of the Board of Trustees
 Gesellschaft für Rechtspolitik (GfR), Member of the Presidium
 Gewerkschaft der Polizei, Member
 ZDF, Member of the Board of Directors (2007-2011)
 RAG-Stiftung, Ex-Officio Member of the Board of Trustees (2007-2011)

Awards and Distinctions
In 2003 Peter Müller was given the Premier of the Year (Ministerpräsident des Jahres)  Award in Berlin for the years 2000 to 2002 for his article "Initiative Neue Soziale Marktwirtschaft" (New Social Free Market Initiative), which was published in the economic magazine WirtschaftsWoche.

Personal life
Müller and his wife Astrid have three children.

References

Based on the German article from March 1, 2006

External links
Peter Müller, CDU Saar 

1955 births
Living people
People from Neunkirchen (German district)
Presidents of the German Bundesrat
University of Bonn alumni
Members of the Landtag of Saarland
Christian Democratic Union of Germany politicians
Grand Crosses with Star and Sash of the Order of Merit of the Federal Republic of Germany
Ministers-President of Saarland
21st-century German politicians
Justices of the Federal Constitutional Court